Kocakli may refer to:
Köcəkli, Azerbaijan
Kozaklı, Turkey